The Mermaid Chair is a 2006 Canadian television romantic drama film directed by Steven Schachter and written by Suzette Couture. It is based on the 2005 novel of the same name by Sue Monk Kidd, and stars Kim Basinger, Alex Carter, and Bruce Greenwood. It was filmed in Cowichan Bay, Telegraph Cove, and Brentwood Bay in British Columbia, Canada, and premiered on Lifetime on September 9, 2006.

Synopsis
Set on a South Carolina barrier island, the movie tells the story of 42-year-old Jessie Sullivan, a married woman who falls in love with a Benedictine monk, and explores themes of mid life marriage crisis and her self-awakening.

Cast
Kim Basinger as Jessie Sullivan
Alex Carter as Brother 'Whit' Thomas
Bruce Greenwood as Hugh Sullivan
Roberta Maxwell as Nelle
Debra Mooney as Kat
Lorena Gale as Hepzibah
Ellie Harvie as Benne
Ken Pogue as Father Dominic
Victoria Anderson as Dee
Shaun Johnston as Joseph Dubois
Alex Bruhanski as Shem
Terence Kelly as Dom Anthony
Joanne Wilson as Woman Patient
Sy Pederson as Brother Timothy
L. Harvey Gold as Tourist

Reception
In her review for Variety Laura Fries called the film "slickly produced" and said it had "haunting cinematography by Mike Southon, an impressive supporting cast".

References

External links
 

2006 television films
English-language Canadian films
2006 films
2006 romantic drama films
Canadian romantic drama films
Canadian drama television films
Films based on American novels
Films based on romance novels
Films directed by Steven Schachter
Films set in South Carolina
Films shot in British Columbia
Lifetime (TV network) films
Romance television films
2000s Canadian films